In music, Op. 98 stands for Opus number 98. Compositions that are assigned this number include:

 Beethoven – An die ferne Geliebte
 Brahms – Symphony No. 4
 Dvořák – American Suite
 Milhaud – L'abandon d'Ariane
 Schubert – Wiegenlied, D 498
 Schumann – Songs from Wilhelm Meister, Requiem for Mignon